Calvignano is a comune (municipality) in the Province of Pavia in the Italian region Lombardy, located about 50 km south of Milan and about 20 km south of Pavia. As of 31 December 2004, it had a population of 112 and an area of 6.9 km².

Calvignano borders the following municipalities: Borgo Priolo, Casteggio, Corvino San Quirico, Montalto Pavese, Oliva Gessi.

Demographic evolution

References

Cities and towns in Lombardy